Zanthoxylum chevalieri is a species of plant in the family Rutaceae. It is endemic to Ghana.  It is threatened by habitat loss.

References

chevalieri
Endemic flora of Ghana
Vulnerable flora of Africa
Taxonomy articles created by Polbot